The West Coast Eagles are an Australian rules football team based in Perth, Western Australia. Their 2020 season was their 34th season in the Australian Football League (AFL), their seventh season under premiership coach Adam Simpson, and the first season with Luke Shuey as captain. The West Coast Eagles finished the season with 12 wins and 5 losses, placing them fifth on the ladder, qualifying for the 2020 AFL finals series, in which they were eliminated in the first round by eighth-placed . The COVID-19 pandemic had a significant impact on their season, with the team forced to hub in Queensland for much of the season due to restrictions on travelling to Western Australia from other states.

Nic Naitanui was West Coast's best and fairest player, winning the John Worsfold Medal. Previously his highest place for the medal was fifth, in 2010. Josh Kennedy, who kicked 34 goals was the club's leading goal-scorer for the seventh time in his career. Naitanui, Liam Ryan and Brad Sheppard were selected for the 2020 All-Australian team.

2020 was the first year for West Coast in the AFL Women's competition, in which they finished seventh. In addition, West Coast withdrew from the West Australian Football League competition in 2020 due to COVID-19 after fielding a team for the first time in 2019.

Background

The West Coast Eagles are an Australian rules football team based in Perth, Western Australia, that competes in the Australian Football League (AFL). They ended the 2019 home-and-away season fifth on the ladder after spending the majority of the season in the top four.

In December 2019, Luke Shuey was named captain of the West Coast Eagles, after Shannon Hurn stepped down from the role. Josh Kennedy remained one of the vice-captains, joined by Jeremy McGovern, who replaced Luke Shuey. Jack Darling, Andrew Gaff, Nic Naitanui and Elliot Yeo rounded out the leadership group.

Adam Simpson was head coach for a seventh season. Some of the assistant coaches changed roles; Jaymie Graham swapped from the forward line to the backline, Luke Webster swapped from the WAFL coach to the forwards coach, and Daniel Pratt swapped from backs to stoppages coach. Nathan van Berlo retained his position as midfield coach. The development coaches were Gavin Bell (head of development), Chance Bateman (forwards), Matt Rosa (midfield) and Mark Nicoski (backs).

In February 2020, as part of West Coast's overall rebrand over the past few years, they released a new version of their club song. The song, which contains a didgeridoo and clapstick intro was written, composed and produced by Ian Berney, and sung by Ian Kenny, both from Perth band Birds of Tokyo.

West Coast's major sponsors for 2020 were fast food outlet Hungry Jack's and online mortgage broker Lendi. The club had 100,776 members in 2020, an 11.4% increase on 2019 membership numbers, despite the COVID-19 pandemic. The membership was the highest in the AFL, the first time this happened to a club outside of Victoria.

Playing list

2019 off-season changes

At the end of their 2019 season, West Coast delisted premiership eagle Chris Masten, Fraser McInnes, Kurt Mutimer and Matthew Allen. In addition, Brodie Riach, Patrick Bines, Keegan Brooksby and Josh Smith from the rookie list were delisted. Brendon Ah Chee and Hamish Brayshaw were also delisted from the primary list, with the Eagles citing it as preparation for the draft. Ah Chee and Brayshaw were later drafted in the 2020 rookie draft.

West Coast's only trade in the 2019 trade period involved receiving Tim Kelly and a 2020 third round pick from Geelong, and pick 52 from Essendon, in exchange for picks 14, 24 and a 2020 first round pick going to Geelong, pick 33 going to Essendon, and Essendon and Geelong exchanging pick 37 and 57. The trade came after Kelly was overlooked by West Coast as a draft pick for five years, instead being drafted by Geelong, where he played the 2018 and 2019 seasons. The trade occurred due to Kelly's desire to return to Western Australia, having previously wanted to trade in the 2018 trade period. Kelly signed a six year deal with West Coast, worth approximately $5 million.

In the 2019 national draft, Callum Jamieson (pick 49) and Ben Johnson (pick 58) were drafted, both of whom are from Western Australia. Francis Watson was elevated from the rookie list, signing on for another year. Anthony Treacy (pick 11), Mitch O'Neill (pick 25), Brendon Ah Chee (pick 33) and Hamish Brayshaw (pick 39) were drafted in the 2020 rookie draft. Nic Reid and Jamaine Jones were added to the rookie list in the supplementary selection period. Jamaine Jones previously played for Geelong in 2018 and 2019, but was delisted at the end of that year.

Statistics
West Coast used 37 players from the 45 on its playing list, six of which were debutants. They were Harry Edwards (round 9), Nic Reid (round 12), Xavier O'Neill (round 13), Bailey Williams (round 14), Hamish Brayshaw (round 17) and Luke Foley (round 18). Tim Kelly (round 1) and Jamaine Jones (round 4) also played their first games for West Coast, after having previously played for Geelong. Six players played every match of the season. They were Tom Barrass, Jack Darling, Andrew Gaff, Tim Kelly, Liam Ryan and Brad Sheppard.

In February 2020, Daniel Venables was ruled out for the entire 2020 season due to concussion as a result of a head knock he suffered in round nine of 2019. Willie Rioli also did not play at all during the 2020 season, having been provisionally suspended for the entire season due to allegedly tampering with two urine tests in August and September 2019. He was eventually sentenced in March 2021 to a two year backdated suspension, starting in August 2019.

Season summary
The original fixture for the 2020 season was revealed by the AFL in October 2019. As part of their pre-season, West Coast faced  and Fremantle in the Marsh Community Series, ending up beaten by both teams. The match against Essendon was originally scheduled for 28 February, but it was rescheduled to the day prior so that it did not occur at the same time as the State of Origin for Bushfire Relief Match.

West Coast played their first game of the regular season on 22 March against  at Optus Stadium. Melbourne were soundly beaten by 27 points in that match, which was Tim Kelly's first game for the Eagles. The match was played with no spectators present, and occurred just hours after AFL chief executive Gillon McLachlan announced that the 2020 AFL season would be suspended until at least the start of June, due to restrictions on interstate travel caused by the COVID-19 pandemic. The Eagles' round 1 match would be the last AFL match to be played for over two months.

On 25 May, the AFL revealed the revised fixtures for rounds 2 to 5. West Coast were to go into a hub on the Gold Coast for at least four weeks, completing matches only in Queensland for that time. On 8 June, the West Coast team arrived at the Royal Pines Resort on the Gold Coast. Their first match after the AFL season continuing was against  at Metricon Stadium, on 13 June. The Suns thrashed the Eagles by 44 points in an upset, giving the 2019 wooden spooners their first win in 426 days. That was West Coast's first match with crowds attending, with 1,965 spectators at the game. West Coast then played , the eventual minor premiers at Metricon Stadium, in which the Eagles were beaten 13.11 (89) to 6.5 (41). That game making it three losses in a row for the Eagles, continuing their horror run in the Queensland hub and placing them 16th on the AFL ladder. Jamaine Jones made his West Coast debut that game, and Will Schofield was suspended for one match after headbutting Zak Butters.

West Coast were scheduled to play  on round 5, but due to Queensland's latest quarantine requirements, West Coast would have had to quarantine for 14 days following a match against a Victorian side. This resulted in the Eagles playing  instead, at Metricon Stadium. West Coast got their first win in the Queensland hub against Sydney, beating them by 30 points. Tom Barrass took a mark of the year contender, and Luke Shuey injured his hamstring, causing him to miss two games. The following round, West Coast beat the winless  by 33 points at the Gabba, in their last game in Queensland before heading home for 7 weeks. During the week prior, Crows ruckman Reilly O'Brien accidentally tweeted that Nic Naitanui was "lazy and unfit", among other notes about the Eagles ruckman. This incident gained notoriety in the days surrounding the round 6 match.

West Coast's first game at Optus Stadium since round 1 was a Western Derby against . The Eagles won 9.8 (62) to 5.2 (32), giving them the longest ever Western Derby winning streak, with 10 wins in a row against Fremantle. Josh Kennedy on his 250th AFL game won the Glendinning–Allan Medal. The game had the largest crowd of any Australian sporting event since the start of the COVID-19 pandemic. In round 8, West Coast beat  by 66 points. West Coast's 18.3 (111) was the largest score of the season at the time, against Collingwood's 6.9 (45). Josh Kennedy kicked 7 goals in the match. The next round, West Coast beat  by 9 points, putting West Coast fourth on the ladder. The Eagles were behind by 21 points during the 3rd quarter, but were able to make a comeback. Josh Kennedy kicked 4 goals, putting him first in the Coleman Medal race. In round 10, West Coast had a bye.

Following the bye, West Coast had three more games in a row at Optus Stadium, of which they won all three. Elliot Yeo developed a groin injury against Carlton, resulting in him missing the rest of the season. At the end of those three rounds, West Coast had the longest winning streak of the season, with eight wins in a row, and were fourth on the ladder. The round 13 Greater Western Sydney match was the first match in a series of five for West Coast over 19 days, from 23 August to 10 September. On 25 August, the team flew over to Queensland for their second hub in that state. The Eagles stayed Sanctuary Cove resort, on the Gold Coast for their hub.

West Coast's first match in their second Queensland hub was against  at Metricon Stadium on Thursday, 27 August. Richmond beat West Coast by 27 points, ending their eight game winning streak. Josh Kennedy received a concussion, causing him to miss out on most of the Richmond game and West Coast's next game. The following Tuesday, West Coast faced , beating them by 15 points, with Liam Ryan kicking four goals. In round 16, after West Coast's second 5 day break in a row, they faced , who beat the Eagles in an upset. The margin was 2 points, and the result eventually caused West Coast to miss the top four.

West Coast were forced to make 6 player changes for their round 17 game against , due to injuries. At the time, Brendon Ah Chee, Mark Hutchings, Lewis Jetta, Jack Redden, Dom Sheed, Luke Shuey and Elliot Yeo were injured, and Jamie Cripps couldn't be selected due to personal reasons. Despite this, the Eagles won against St Kilda by 15 points, guaranteeing them a finals spot, however Jeremy McGovern injured his hamstring, leaving him out for the final match of the home-and-away season, against . West Coast won their round 18 match against North Melbourne by 15 points, giving them a small chance of a top 4 finish, but neither Richmond or Geelong lost their matches, causing West Coast to finish 5th at the end of the season, setting them up for an elimination final against Collingwood.

West Coast's elimination final against  occurred on Saturday, 3 October. The Eagles went into the match as favourites, due to having beat the Magpies by 66 points earlier in the season, having won all games at home during the home-and-away season, and being higher on the ladder than the Magpies. However, after several lead changes in the match, Collingwood ended up winning the elimination final by 1 point, ending West Coast's 2020 season. This was the first year since 2016 where West Coast did not progress beyond the first week of the finals.

Results

Ladder

Impact of COVID-19

During the week prior to the 2020 season starting, the AFL announced that the season would be shorted from 22 matches per team to 17 matches per team, with each team playing each other once. This meant 2020 was the first year where only one Western Derby took place. At the time, the AFL said the first four rounds of the season would remain as previously fixtured, with the remaining rounds to be refixtured. It also announced that there would not be any spectators at games for the first time in the league's history, and that each quarter would be only 16 minutes long, to facilitate shortening the breaks between each game. Round 1 went ahead as originally fixtured, however the AFL announced on the Sunday of round 1 that the league would be postponed until at least the start of June. The remaining matches of round 1 occurred, including the West Coast match, but no more matches occurred for over two months.

On 12 May 2020, the AFL ruled that AFL players are not allowed to play in state leagues as part of strict protocols implemented due to COVID-19. This resulted in West Coast withdrawing from the West Australian Football League for 2020. Western Australia's COVID-19 border restrictions meant that any travellers from interstate would have to quarantine for 14 days. This made it impractical to hold AFL matches in Perth. In order to get the season back up and running, West Coast stayed in a hub on the Gold Coast for five weeks, playing matches at Metricon Stadium and the Gabba. The season resumed on 11 June. From round 3 onwards, matches in Queensland were allowed to have small crowds.

From rounds 7 to 13, West Coast were back in Perth, playing consecutive games at Optus Stadium. To get around the interstate travel quarantine requirement, two interstate teams would go to Western Australia, and play each other for their first week in the state, under strict quarantine while doing so. Initially Optus Stadium was meant to be at its full capacity of 60,000 spectators, but the Western Australian government restricted it to 30,000 spectators after a spike in virus numbers in Victoria. Due to West Coast having already played Sydney, they flew back over to Queensland after playing Greater Western Sydney for a second hub on the Gold Coast.

West Coast played their remaining six matches of the home-and-away season at Metricon Stadium and the Gabba. Rounds 13 through to 17 were condensed in order for the season to finish sooner. This resulted in the Eagles playing five matches over 19 days. The deal would have meant West Coast pay North Melbourne between $700,000 and $800,000, however the AFL did not allow that deal to go ahead. The match was played at North Melbourne's preferred ground of Metricon Stadium.

West Coast went back home for their preliminary final against , which they hosted at Optus Stadium. Prior to the match, West Coast quarantined in Perth for 14 days, and Collingwood quarantined for 7 days. Due to the Magpie's short quarantine period, it was initially believed that the Eagles would have to quarantine for 14 days if they lost, but it was later confirmed that they would quarantine for 7 days. The Western Australian government increased the allowed capacity of the stadium to 35,000, including staff and officials, meaning that approximately 33,000 spectators were allowed to attend the game.

Awards

Nic Naitanui, Liam Ryan and Brad Sheppard were all selected in the 2020 All-Australian team. Andrew Gaff was in the 40-man initial squad but was not selected for the final team. West Coast had the equal highest number of players in the 2020 All-Australian team that year, with three. 2020 was the first time Liam Ryan and Brad Sheppard were selected in the All-Australian team, and the second time Nic Naitanui was selected.

West Coast held its awards night on 19 October at the Crown Perth Grand Ballroom. Nic Naitanui won the John Worsfold Medal with 194 votes. Behind him was Andrew Gaff (192), Brad Sheppard (163), Tom Barrass (154) and Liam Duggan (152). This was Naitanui's first John Worsfold Medal, and the second time a ruckman won the award. His previous highest place for the medal was fifth, in 2010. Other awards presented on the night were the Chris Mainwaring Medal for Best Clubman, awarded to Brad Sheppard; Emerging Talent, awarded to Josh Rotham; Player of the finals, awarded to Nic Naitanui; and Leading Goalkicker, awarded to Josh Kennedy. Jamie Cripps, who played his 150th game for the club in 2020 was awarded life membership of the West Coast Eagles, along with former eagles Eric Mackenzie and Beau Waters, and former club chairman Alan Cransberg.

Notes

See also
 2020 West Coast Eagles women's season

References

West Coast Eagles seasons
2020 Australian Football League season